CocoCay or Little Stirrup Cay is one of the Berry Islands, a collection of Bahamian cays and small islands located approximately 55 miles north of Nassau. It is used for tourism by Royal Caribbean Group exclusively.  Little Stirrup Cay is adjacent to Great Stirrup Cay, Norwegian Cruises' private island since 1977.

Description 
The island is less than a mile (1.57 kilometer) long from east to west and less than 480 yards (0.43 kilometer) from north to south. It has a population of 38 (2010 census).

In 2019, the island was extensively renovated by Royal Caribbean at the cost of US$250 million. The island is marketed as a Royal Caribbean private destination named "Perfect Day at CocoCay" A pier was constructed on the north side of the island, which allows cruise ships to dock directly instead of using tenders. The east end is the center of recreational activities with beaches fronting a coral basin where manatees, rays, and numerous fish can be seen. Nature trails run the entire length and width of the island. The renovation also included a water park, with North America's largest and tallest water slide, Daredevil's Peak.

Tourism 
Royal Caribbean Cruises Ltd., which owns Royal Caribbean International and Celebrity Cruises, assumed the lease of the island upon acquisition of Admiral Cruises in 1988. It was renamed to “Perfect day Coco Cay” in 2018. The island is now separated into 2 different sides, the “thrill” side (which is the water park) with 2 different towers containing a total of 9 slides, and a pool with different amenities, and a wave pool. And a “chill” side, that contains many different beaches lined with chairs and hammocks. Also available on the island are different cabanas that guests can rent out during their time on the island

Climate

References

External links

Aerial photos of Little Stirrup Cay
A former caretaker writes about life on the island 
About the Stirrup cays
Images tagged with "Coco Cay" at Flickr

Berry Islands
Royal Caribbean International
Private islands of the Bahamas